Zhu Zhu (born 19 July 1984) is a Chinese actress and singer. She rose to fame as a VJ on MTV China.

Early life
Zhu was born in a military family in Beijing on July 19, 1984, with her ancestral home in Linhai, Zhejiang, the daughter of Zhu Hanbin, a Chinese businessman. Her grandfather Zhu Xuzhi (1912–2000) was a major general of the People's Liberation Army.

Zhu started to learn the piano at the age of 3. When she was a junior school student, she performed Beauty and the Beast, an English stage.

Zhu graduated from Beijing Technology and Business University, where she majored in electronics and information engineering.

Personal life
Zhu was in a relationship with Italian businessman Lapo Elkann from 2012 to 2013.

On March 18, 2021 Zhu married Wang Yunjia, a lecturer at Tsinghua University's Fine Art Department. They announced the birth of their first child, a daughter named Pearl, on September 2, 2021.

Career
In 2005, Zhu joined MTV China and hosted music programs on China's domestic MTV network. Zhu was discovered by talent scouts after winning a local singing contest in Beijing, then placing third at the national level.

Zhu signed with music label MBOX in 2007 and her first album was released in 2009.

In 2010, Zhu made her film debut in What Women Want, a Chinese romantic comedy film starring Andy Lau and Gong Li.

In 2012, Zhu played the character Chi Chi in an American martial arts film The Man with the Iron Fists, alongside RZA, Russell Crowe, Cung Le, Lucy Liu, Byron Mann, Rick Yune, Dave Bautista, and Jamie Chung. The film grossed  million  on its first day.

In 2012, Zhu participated in five films, such as Shanghai Calling, Secret Sharer, and Cloud Atlas.

In 2014, Zhu starred in a supporting role in the romantic comedy film The Old Cinderella, produced by Lu Chuan.

In 2014, Zhu played the female lead in the film Last Flight, opposite Ed Westwick and featuring Leon Lee and Cary Alexander.

In 2014, Zhu began starring in the American TV series Marco Polo which premiered on Netflix in December 2014.

In 2016, Zhu signed on for a Bollywood historical war drama film Tubelight, opposite Salman Khan. The film is directed by Kabir Khan and was released on Eid 2017. It was the first time that she was in Bollywood. She reached Mumbai on 3 August 2016 to learn Hindi as soon as possible.

Filmography

Film

Television

Variety shows

Album
 Zhu Zhu

Awards and nominations

References

External links

Zhu Zhu at hkmdb.com
Zhu Zhu at chinesemov.com

Living people
1984 births
Actresses from Beijing
Singers from Beijing
Chinese film actresses
Chinese television actresses
Chinese television personalities
Beijing Technology and Business University alumni
The Amazing Race contestants
Participants in Chinese reality television series
Chinese expatriates in India
Expatriate actresses in India
Actresses in Hindi cinema
21st-century Chinese actresses
21st-century Chinese women singers